Thomas Leo Hicks (24 January 1916 – 17 March 2005) was an Australian rules footballer who played with Fitzroy and Collingwood in the Victorian Football League (VFL).

Notes

External links 

Profile at Collingwood Forever

1916 births
2005 deaths
Australian rules footballers from Victoria (Australia)
Fitzroy Football Club players
Collingwood Football Club players
Yarrawonga Football Club players